The Gibson EDS-1275 is a doubleneck Gibson  electric guitar introduced in 1963 and still in production. Popularized and raised to iconic status by musicians such as John McLaughlin and Jimmy Page, it was called "the coolest guitar in rock."

History
Gibson's first doubleneck guitars were produced from 1958 to 1961 with a hollow body and two 6-string necks, one being a short-scale neck tuned to a higher octave; from 1962 to 1967 it had a solid body. A model with a 4-string bass and a 6-string guitar neck was called the EBS-1250; it had a built-in fuzztone and was produced from 1962 to 1968 and again from 1977 to 1978.

In 1963, the solid-body EDS-1275 was designed, resembling the SG model; this version of the doubleneck was available until 1968. The guitar was available in jet black, cherry, sunburst, and white.

In 1974, Gibson started making the guitar again, in a number of additional colors, with production lasting until 1998. Since then, alpine white and heritage cherry versions were made by Gibson USA in Nashville, Tennessee, until 2003, in the Nashville Custom Shop from 2004 to 2005, and in the Memphis, Tennessee, Custom Shop beginning in 2006.

Notable EDS-1275 users

The EDS-1275, while never selling in great quantities, was used by a number of notable musicians. Chicago bluesman Earl Hooker is seen holding one on the cover of the 1969 albums Two Bugs and a Roach and The Moon is Rising, and Elvis Presley sports a cherry doubleneck in the 1966 movie Spinout.

John McLaughlin

In the early 1970s, jazz-rock musician John McLaughlin played an EDS-1275 in his first years with the Mahavishnu Orchestra.

Jimmy Page
The EDS-1275 was mostly popularized by Jimmy Page of Led Zeppelin, most notably during live performances of "Stairway to Heaven." The doubleneck eliminated the need to switch guitars mid-song: at the beginning of "Stairway to Heaven", he used the bottom 6-string neck for the intro and first verse, then switched to the top 12-string neck, then to the 6-string neck for the extended guitar solo, and back to the 12-string for the final chorus.

By the time Page desired an EDS-1275, they were no longer in production so he ordered a custom-made cherry 6/12. Page's influence was such that after him other guitarists picked up the EDS-1275, including Alex Lifeson of Rush, who used it to play the song "Xanadu" live. Eddie Van Halen also had one in his collection. Tommy Shaw of Styx had a custom double neck which had two 12 string necks which he used live with Styx on the band's live performances from 1977 to 1983 on "Fooling Yourself" (live versions from 1977 and 1978), "Suite Madame Blue" (up to the end of the synthesizer solo where he would switch to his Les Paul or Explorer or Ibanez guitar) and "Queen Of Spades" (for the intro and outro).

Don Felder 
Don Felder's white EDS-1275 was most famously used for playing Hotel California live with the Eagles and now (via Gibson Custom Shop replicas) in solo shows. It can be seen in any number of clips from the mid to late 70s. Felder customised his EDS-1275 by removing one of the pots (bridge pickup tone control), and replacing it with a second output. This allowed for the signal to be sent to two separate amplifiers: for Hotel California, an Echoplex and a Leslie for the swirling tones (played on the 12 string neck capo at the seven fret), and then later through his standard guitar amp (a Blackface Deluxe Reverb or Tweed Deluxe) using the six string neck for the duet/harmony guitar solo shared with Joe Walsh. Felder's original EDS-1275 is on display at the Rock and Roll Hall of Fame in Cleveland.

Models

Current model

, the guitar is offered only through the Gibson Custom Shop as a special order model. It features two volume and two tone control knobs, a three-way pickup-selector switch, and a three-way neck-selector switch. It has vintage tulip tuners, pearloid split parallelogram inlays, black pickguards and pickup rings, twenty frets per neck (bound with single-ply white binding), and 490 Alnico (R) and 498 Alnico (T) humbucking pickups. The Custom Shop also makes a Don Felder "Hotel California" signature model. New Gibson EDS-1275 and Epiphone G-1275 models feature longer 12-string headstocks than the original EDS-1275 and the "Hotel California" EDS-1275.

Signature models
Gibson released a Jimmy Page Signature EDS-1275 model in 2007; a total of 250 were made. Page kept serial number one for himself. Serial numbers 2 through 26 of these were played and signed by Page; number 11 was donated for auction to benefit a charitable cause.

In 2019, Gibson announced a black model for Slash.

Similar models

Epiphone

Epiphone (a Gibson subsidiary) makes a version of the classic doubleneck, marketing it as the G-1275.

Ibanez
Japanese guitar manufacturer Ibanez produced a model inspired by the Gibson, called the Double Axe, from 1974 to 1976. They were available as a 6/12, a 4/6, and a 6/6 configuration, in cherry and walnut finishes.

References

Bibliography

External links

 

EDS-1275
1963 musical instruments
Gibson SG